Mike Roche (born September 23 in Pascack Valley, New Jersey) is an American actor.  Roche played Humphrey James in the 2007 Off-Broadway revival of Night Over Taos by Maxwell Anderson directed by Academy Award Winner Estelle Parsons at Theatre for the New City in New York City.  The show was produced by INTAR Theatre (Eduardo Machado, Artistic Director).

Early life and education

Roche was raised in Bergenfield, New Jersey and is a graduate of Bergenfield High School.  He earned his Bachelor of Arts in Literature with a minor in Political Science from Ramapo College.   He is an Eagle Scout and while at Ramapo College he played baseball and received the college's highest honor, the Dean's Award, for "Exceptional Service to the Campus Community".

Career

Roche played the role of Droog Pete in the 2004 – 2005 New York City theatrical production of A Clockwork Orange by Anthony Burgess at the Ensemble Studio Theatre and 59E59 Theaters and played Faber in the 2006 New York City theatrical premiere of Fahrenheit 451 by Ray Bradbury at 59E59 Theaters.  The productions were both directed by Joe Tantalo and were produced by Tantalo's Drama Desk Award Winning Godlight Theatre Company.

He performed in both A Clockwork Orange and Fahrenheit 451 when they transferred from New York City to the Edinburgh Festival.

Roche played Humphrey James in the 2007 Off-Broadway revival of Night Over Taos by Maxwell Anderson directed by Academy Award Winner Estelle Parsons at Theatre for the New City in New York City.  The show was produced by INTAR Theatre (Eduardo Machado, Artistic Director).

He is a member of the 2010 Drama Desk Special Award winning Godlight Theatre Company ("consistent originality and excellence in dramatizing modern literature, and especially for the vibrant theatricality of its innovative productions.").

Roche played Father Flynn in the first New York Revival of John Patrick Shanley's Tony Award winning play Doubt: A Parable in October 2012.

In 2020, Roche performed the role of Larry Slade in Eugene O'Neill's The Iceman Cometh in the two-part Zoom Premiere on YouTube Live as a benefit for the Actors Fund during the COVID-19 pandemic of 2020.

Personal life

Roche married actress and singer Holly O'Brien on August 28, 2016 in New York City.

References

Male actors from New York City
Living people
American male stage actors
Male actors from New Jersey
Year of birth missing (living people)
Bergenfield High School alumni
Ramapo College alumni
People from Bergenfield, New Jersey